Jenny Oaks Baker (born Jenny June Oaks; May 27, 1975) is a Grammy nominated American violinist and former member of the National Symphony Orchestra. She has released eighteen studio albums, several of which have topped or nearly topped Billboard charts.

Music career

Baker began playing the violin at age four, and made her solo orchestral debut in 1983 at the age of eight. She also won several competition awards in her youth. 

She earned a Bachelor of Music degree in violin performance from Curtis Institute of Music (Philadelphia, 1997) and a Master of Music degree from Juilliard School (New York City, 1999).

With Shadow Mountain Records, she has released twelve albums. Her album, Wish Upon a Star: A Tribute to the Music of Walt Disney, earned a nomination at the 54th Grammy Awards for Best Pop Instrumental Album. Several of her albums have listed on Billboard charts, including her 2010 album Then Sings My Soul; her 2012 album, Noël: Carols of Christmas Past which was produced and arranged by composer Kurt Bestor featuring vocalist Alex Sharpe; and her 2014 album Classic: The Rock Album.

She has performed as a soloist at Carnegie Hall, Lincoln Center, Strathmore Hall, the Library of Congress and as a guest soloist with the National Symphony, Jerusalem Symphony, Pittsburgh Symphony, San Diego Symphony, Utah Symphony, and the Tabernacle Choir at Temple Square. She has also been featured in television and radio broadcasts nationwide.  Her BYUTV In Performance special, "Silver Screen Serenade", features Baker performing music from her 2008 album of the same name.  She has collaborated with  Gladys Knight, Marvin Hamlisch, Lisa Hopkins Seegmiller, Kurt Bestor, Mike Masse, and former Secretary of State Condoleezza Rice.

Baker's music has been featured on the soundtracks of many films, including Helen Whitney's 2007 PBS documentary miniseries, The Mormons, T. C. Christensen's 2011 film, 17 Miracles and 2015 film The Cokeville Miracle, and Mitch Davis' 2015 film, Christmas Eve which also features her acting debut as the violinist character, Mandy.

Baker served as a judge for the 2007 Stradivarius International Violin Competition. In April 2008, Governor Jon M. Huntsman Jr. of Utah awarded her the Governor’s Mansion Artist Award for excellence in artistic expression.

For seven years, Baker performed as a first violinist in the National Symphony Orchestra before resigning in 2007 to devote more time to her family.

Personal life
Baker is a daughter of Dallin H. Oaks, a former Brigham Young University president and Utah Supreme Court justice, who is now the second-ranking leader in the Church of Jesus Christ of Latter-day Saints (LDS Church), and June Oaks ( Dixon).  She is a member of the LDS Church and an alumna of East High School (1993).  

During 1996-98 Jenny was in a relationship with well known Australian violinist Brett Hinch. Sadly, the distance of travel proved too much. They remain good friends to this day.

Baker is married to Matthew Baker. They live in Utah with their four children Laura, Hannah, Sarah, and Matthew Jr, who perform with her on two records and in concert as "Family Four".

Discography
On Wings of Song (1998)
 The King and I Rodgers and Hammerstein Tribute (1998) - Jenny Oakes Baker and Brett Hinch 
Songs My Mother Taught Me (1999)
Where Love Is (2000)
American Tapestry (2001)
The Light Divine (2003)
 The Best of Jenny Oaks Baker (2005)
O Holy Night (2007)
Silver Screen Serenade (2008)
Then Sings My Soul (2010) 
Wish Upon a Star: A Tribute to the Music of Walt Disney (2011)
Noel: Carols of Christmas Past (2012)
Classic: The Rock Album (2014) 
My Home Can Be a Holy Place (2015)
Awakening (2016)
The Spirit Of God (2018)
Epic (2020)

Jenny Oaks Baker & Family Four
Jenny Oaks Baker & Family Four (2019)
Joy to the World (2020)

Filmography

Awards and nominations

Grammy Awards
The Grammy Awards are awarded annually by the National Academy of Recording Arts and Sciences of the United States.

|-
|rowspan="1"|2012
|rowspan="1"|Wish Upon a Star: A Tribute to the Music of Walt Disney
|Best Pop Instrumental Album
|
|-

Other Awards
Concerto Soloists National Young Artists String Competition - Winner
National Music Camp Concerto Competition - Winner
Utah Symphony Guild Competition - Winner 
Kingsville International String Competition - Honors
Irving M. Klein International String Competition (1996) - Michaelian Prize
Governor's Mansion Artist Award (2008)

References

External links

 Official website

Jenny Oaks Baker on YouTube

1975 births
American classical violinists
Latter Day Saints from Utah
Juilliard School alumni
Living people
Musicians from Provo, Utah
Curtis Institute of Music alumni
Classical musicians from Virginia
21st-century classical violinists
Women classical violinists